Henry Philpott (20 December 1829 — 29 March 1880) was an English cricketer who played for Sussex. He was born and died in Brighton.

Philpott made a single first-class appearance, during the 1855 season, against Surrey. From the lower order, Philpott scored 1 not out in the first innings in which he batted, and 10 runs in the second.

External links
Henry Philpott at Cricket Archive 

1829 births
1880 deaths
English cricketers
Sussex cricketers